The following is a list of housing projects under the Detroit Housing Commission in the city of Detroit, Michigan, United States.

Senior Housing

Public housing not under the Detroit Housing Commission

Demolished buildings

References

External links
Detroit Housing Commission Homepage
City of Detroit Public Housing
RentLaw.com | Detroit Public Housing List
ParksideTheBricks.com | Parkside Homes Memories Website
Detroit Public Housing History & Legacy Memoirs 

 
Public housing